William Sawyer (November 25, 1815 – January 11, 1904) was a lumber merchant and political figure in Quebec. He represented Compton in the Legislative Assembly of Quebec from 1871 to 1886 as a Conservative.

He was born in Sawyerville, Quebec, the son of John Sawyer. His grandfather, Josiah Sawyer, after whom Sawyerville was named, was originally from Massachusetts and received a large land grant in Eaton Township. Sawyer owned sawmills and grist mills. He was a member of the council for Eaton Township from 1855 to 1872, serving as mayor, and was warden for Compton County. In 1839, he married Julia Smith. He died at Sawyerville at the age of 88.

References
 
two

1815 births
1904 deaths
Conservative Party of Quebec MNAs
Mayors of places in Quebec